Marvin Hinton (born 2 February 1940) is an English former footballer who made nearly 400 appearances in the Football League playing as a defender for Charlton Athletic and Chelsea.

Early life
Hinton was born in Norwood, and brought up in South Norwood  London SE25 and attended nearby Ashburton School.

Career

Charlton
He began his football career with Charlton Athletic F.C. having overlooked his local club Crystal Palace, making his debut in the Second Division in the 1957–58 season. While a Charlton player he won three caps for the England under-23 team. 

Hinton made his League debut as a full back but he later made a number of appearances at wing-half and inside-forward before earning a regular first-team place at centre-half in 1961 following an injury to Gordon Jago.

Chelsea
After scoring twice from 131 appearances in the Football League, Hinton was signed for Chelsea by Tommy Docherty in August 1963 for £30,000. He made his Chelsea debut on 12 October 1963 in a 3–1 win at Ipswich Town.

When Hinton moved to Chelsea he reverted to full back.  Playing as part of a richly-talented team including the likes of Charlie Cooke, Alan Hudson, Bobby Tambling, John Hollins, Peter Bonetti and Peter Osgood he was part of the successful Chelsea side of the 60s and early 70s, earning his first winners' medal with the League Cup in 1965. After the departure of John Mortimore and Frank Upton, Hinton formed a long lasting partnership with Ron Harris in central defence. An appearance in the 1967 FA Cup Final defeat to Tottenham Hotspur earned him a runners-up medal and further success was to follow with victory in the 1970 FA Cup Final, where Chelsea defeated Leeds United, the reigning League Champions and one of the strongest teams of the era, in a replay at Old Trafford; Hinton came on as a substitute in both games. as the signing of John Dempsey and David Webb increased competition for first team places. Under coach (and later Manager) Dave Sexton, Hinton, Harris and Eddie McCreadie pioneered the zonal marking system of defense in the English First Division, consistently playing together throughout the Sixties.

Hinton continued to play for Chelsea until 1976, although further success eluded the club after their 1971 Cup Winner's Cup victory, culminating in relegation to the Second Division a year before Hinton left Stamford Bridge. After his League career he had a spell with Barnet before retirement.

In all, he made 344 appearances for Chelsea between 1963 and 1976, scoring 4 goals.

International football
Though a member of Alf Ramsey's provisional 40-man squad for the 1966 World Cup, he never won a full cap.

References

1940 births
Living people
Barnet F.C. players
Charlton Athletic F.C. players
Chelsea F.C. players
English footballers
England under-23 international footballers
Sportspeople from Crawley
English Football League players
Association football defenders
FA Cup Final players